Stepaside is a village in the townland of Kilgobbin, on the southern edge of Dublin, in Dún Laoghaire–Rathdown, Ireland.

Location and access
A suburb of Dublin, Stepaside lies on the R117 regional road to the south-east of the city, at the foot of Three Rock Mountain. The area is located just off Junction 14 of the M50 motorway. Neighbouring areas include Sandyford, Kilternan, Ballyogan, Leopardstown, Carrickmines, Belarmine and Glencullen.

Stepaside village developed in the 18th and early 19th centuries when the adjacent medieval settlement of Kilgobbin was bypassed by a new stretch of the Enniskerry Road, built from what is now Lamb's Cross through to Kilternan. Stepaside became a new staging post along this route, while Kilgobbin Road with its coaching inn (now Oldtown House) was no longer used by goods traffic or stagecoaches.

Stepaside is served by Dublin Bus routes 44, 47 and 118 and Go-Ahead Ireland 63 and 63a.

Development

Previously a separate rural village, as of the early 21st century, Stepaside has been absorbed by the Dublin conurbation to the north and east, and has seen accompanying residential development and population growth.

In 2007, Dún Laoghaire–Rathdown County Council announced plans to build a community park for the Carrickmines, Ballyogan, and Stepaside areas. A large civic centre in the area is named after Samuel Beckett.

Stepaside contains several shops, restaurants and pubs, including The Step Inn and Quattro. There is a local fish and chips takeaway called Borza's. There is also a Garda station, a medical practice and pharmacy in the village.

Sport
Local soccer (association football) clubs include Stepaside F.C, Wayside Celtic F.C. at Kilternan. There is also an all-weather pitch at Jamestown in Stepaside. While there are no Gaelic Athletic Association clubs in the area, nearby clubs include Naomh Olaf (Sandyford), Kilmacud Crokes (Stillorgan), and Stars of Erin (Glencullen).

There are a number of golf courses, driving ranges and par 3 golf facilities in the area.

People 
Former or current residents of the village have included:
Alan Byrne, retired Irish soccer player of the 1980s and 1990s
Mick Curley, chairman of the Irish National Referees' Association who was previously stationed in the village in the 1970s as a Garda Síochána Superintendent
Joe Elliott, the lead singer of Def Leppard.
Neale Richmond, Irish Fine Gael politician
Hal Roach, comedian.

See also 
List of towns and villages in Ireland

References 

Towns and villages in Dún Laoghaire–Rathdown